Triaenodes tridontus was a species of insect in family Leptoceridae. It was endemic to the United States.

References

Trichoptera
Extinct animals of North America
Endemic fauna of the United States
Insects of the United States
Taxonomy articles created by Polbot